Ratne (Ratno) is an urban settlement (town) in Volyn Oblast (province), located in the historic region of the Volhynia. Population:

History
Ratne is mentioned in old Ruthenian documents at the end of 12th - beginning of 13th centuries. It served as a border town where Great Prince kept his garrison (rat). The town was devastated during the Mongol invasion. In the 13th century the town housed the Ratne monastery whose hegumen was Peter of Moscow. After the Galicia-Volhynia Wars, in 14th century the territory around Ratne was annexed by the Kingdom of Poland.

Ratne was granted Magdeburg city rights by Polish King Władysław III in the 15th century. From 1366 until the partitions of Poland it was part of the Chełm Land. It was a royal city of the Crown of the Kingdom of Poland. From 1921 to 1939 it was part of the Volhynian Voivodeship of Poland.

The city had a significant Jewish population before World War II. During the war, the Jewish community suffered many attacks.
The biggest massacre was on August 25, 1942. Some 1,300 persons were taken to the quarry outside the town and there fire was opened on them. A few dozen artisans remained in the town but by March 1943 these had been gradually killed off.

Of those who had fled some 30 families gathered in the forest. They succeeded in obtaining a few arms and they set up a sort of camp. During the next three months nearly all of them were slaughtered. A handful from Ratne and the surrounding villages joined various Soviet partisan units.

Gallery

References

External links
 Ratne at the Ukrainian Soviet Encyclopedia
 Ratne, Volyn Oblast in The History of Cities and Villages of the Ukrainian SSR

Urban-type settlements in Kovel Raion
Ruthenian Voivodeship
Jewish Ukrainian history
Kingdom of Galicia–Volhynia
Holocaust locations in Ukraine